Mubarak Hossain is a Awami League politician and the former Member of Parliament of Dhaka-28.

Career
Hossain was elected to parliament from Dhaka-28 as an Awami League candidate in 1973. He was elected to parliament from Rajshahi-5 as a Jatiya Party candidate in 1986.

Death 
Hossain died in 1995.

References

Awami League politicians
1st Jatiya Sangsad members
1995 deaths